These are the Billboard Hot 100 number one hits of 1965.

That year, 14 acts hit number one for the first time: Petula Clark, The Righteous Brothers, Gary Lewis & the Playboys, The Temptations, Freddie and the Dreamers, Wayne Fontana and the Mindbenders, Herman's Hermits, The Four Tops, The Byrds, The Rolling Stones, Sonny & Cher, Barry McGuire, The McCoys, and The Dave Clark Five. The Beatles, The Supremes, The Byrds, Herman's Hermits and The Rolling Stones were the only acts to have more than one song reach number one that year, with The Beatles having the most with five and The Supremes next with four, and The Byrds, Herman's Hermits, and The Rolling Stones with two.

Chart history

Number-one artists

See also
1965 in music
Cashbox Top 100 number-one singles of 1965
List of Billboard number-one singles

References

Additional sources
Fred Bronson's Billboard Book of Number 1 Hits, 5th Edition
Joel Whitburn's Top Pop Singles 1955-2008, 12 Edition
Joel Whitburn Presents the Billboard Hot 100 Charts: The Sixties
Additional information obtained from Billboard's online archive services and print editions of the magazine.

United States Hot 100
1965